Apple Valley is the name of six localities in the United States:

Apple Valley, California, a town
Apple Valley, Georgia, an unincorporated community
Apple Valley, Minnesota, a city
Apple Valley, North Dakota, an unincorporated community
Apple Valley, Ohio, an unincorporated community
Apple Valley, Utah, a town